Epicrocis mesembrina is a species of snout moth in the genus Epicrocis. It was described by Edward Meyrick in 1887 and is known from Australia.

References

Moths described in 1887
Phycitini
Endemic fauna of Australia